The Royal Philosophical Society of Glasgow is a learned society established in 1802 "for the improvement of the Arts and Sciences" in the city of Glasgow, Scotland. It runs a programme of lectures, starting its 220th Series in October 2021.  The Society formerly owned a building on Bath Street, but since 1994 has been accommodated within the University of Strathclyde.

History
The Society was founded in 1802 as the Glasgow Philosophical Society by a meeting of sixty people in the former Assembly Rooms, and work began establishing a library collection. The Society was housed in various short-term accommodation until 1831, when a room was made available in the Andersonian University (now the University of Strathclyde). The Society subsequently moved to the Corporation Galleries on Sauchiehall Street in 1868, and in 1880, in conjunction with the Institution of Engineers and Shipbuilders in Scotland, built new premises on Bath Street.

The Society was made a Royal Society in 1901, shortly before its centenary, by Edward VII while Archibald Campbell, 1st Baron Blythswood was President. In 1961, the Society's building was sold and the library, which by that time contained over five thousand volumes, dispersed. The Society began renting lecture halls at the University of Strathclyde. The archives of the Society are now maintained by the Archives of the University of Glasgow.

Activities
The Society runs a programme of lectures through the year, including the Kelvin and Graham Lectures, commemorating physicist Lord Kelvin and chemist Thomas Graham respectively, and for which medals are awarded.  Lord Kelvin was president of the Society and Thomas Graham Vice-President.

The Arts Medal was replaced in 2011 by the Minerva Medal. “Arts” was thought to be restrictive and it was decided that, as Minerva was goddess not only of wisdom but also of music, poetry, medicine, commerce, weaving, crafts and magic,  her broad portfolio covers both Arts and Humanities. For example, a recent recipient (2021) is Alison Phipps OBE FRSE, refugee researcher and first UNESCO Chair in Refugee Integration through Languages and the Arts. The image of Minerva appearing on the medal is taken from the image carved on the President’s chair which is on permanent loan to the University of Strathclyde. 

Recordings of lectures in recent years are archived at the University of Strathclyde.

Notable former presidents
Professor Thomas Anderson, chemist
Archibald Campbell, 1st Baron Blythswood, politician
James Bryce, 1st Viscount Bryce, politician
William Gillies, nationalist
Professor Thomas Graham, chemist (Vice-President)
John Graham Kerr, embryologist
Lord Kelvin, physicist
Professor Thomas Thomson, chemist
Dr David Templeton Gibson FRSE, chemist

See also
List of Royal Societies
University of Glasgow
University of Strathclyde
Royal Society of Edinburgh

References

External links
 The Royal Philosophical Society of Glasgow Web site
 Historical records in NAHSTE

Scientific societies based in the United Kingdom
Learned societies of Scotland
Science and technology in Glasgow
Organizations established in 1802
1802 establishments in Scotland
Organisations based in Glasgow with royal patronage